Walk Away or Walkaway may refer to:

Places 
 Walkaway, Western Australia, a town in Australia

Arts and entertainment

Films and television
 Walkaway (film), a 2010 film

Literature
 Walkaway (Cory Doctorow novel), a 2017 sci-fi novel by Cory Doctorow
 The Walkaway, a 2002 novel by Scott Phillps

Music 
 "Walk Away" (Christina Aguilera song), 2002
 "Walk Away" (Aloha from Hell song), 2008
 "Walk Away" / "Jailbreak", a 2005 single by Burden Brothers and Supersuckers
 "Walkaway" (song), a 1996 song by Cast from All Change
 "Walk Away" (Kelly Clarkson song), 2006
 "Walk Away" (Cool for August song), 1997
 "Walkaways", a 1996 song by Counting Crows from Recovering the Satellites
 "Walk Away" (Paula DeAnda song), 2006
 "Walk Away" (Five Finger Death Punch song), 2009
 "Walk Away" (Franz Ferdinand song)
 "Walk Away" (Funeral for a Friend song), 2005
 "Walk Away" (Tony Moran song), 2007
 "Walk Away" (Alanis Morissette song), 1991
 "Walk Away" (James Gang song), 1971
 "Walk Away" (Jasmine V song), 2014
 "Walk Away" (Donna Summer song), 1979
 "Walk Away", a song by Matt Monro, 1964
 "Walk Away", a song by Bad Religion from Against the Grain (1990)
 "Walk Away (From a Good Thing)", a song by the Bicycles from Oh No, It's Love (2008)
 "Walk Away", a song by Black Sabbath from Heaven and Hell (1980)
 "Walk Away", a song by Michael Bolton, a cover of a Diane Warren song
 "Walk Away", a song by The Box
 "Walk Away", a song by Burden Brothers from Queen O' Spades (2002)
 "Walk Away", a song by Cheap Trick from Busted (1990)
 "Walk Away", a song by Nick Dean
 "Walk Away", a song by Dokken from Beast from the East (1988)
 "Walk Away", a song by Dropkick Murphys from Blackout (2003)
 "Walk Away (Maybe)", a song by Good Charlotte from The Chronicles of Life and Death (2004)
 "Walk Away", a song by Green Day from ¡Tre! (2012)
 "Walk Away", a song by Ben Harper from Welcome to the Cruel World (1994)
 "Walk Away", a song by Martina McBride from Shine (2009)
 "Walk Away", a song by The Nadas, used on Pinks
 "Walk Away", a song by Nelly from M.O. (2013)
 "Walk Away", a song by Pink from Try This (2003)
 "Walkaway", a song by Pseudo Echo from Autumnal Park (1984)
 "Walk Away", a song by the Script from Science & Faith (2010)
 "Walk Away", a song by September from Love CPR (2011)
 "Walk Away", a song by Sevendust from Chapter VII: Hope & Sorrow (2008)
 "Walk Away", a song by Shane Fenton and the Fentones
 "Walk Away", a song by Del Shannon from Rock On! (1991)
 "Walk Away", a song by the Sisters of Mercy from First and Last and Always (1985)
 "Walk Away", a song by Westlife from World of Our Own (2001)
 "Walk Away", a song from High School Musical 3: Senior Year (2008)

Others
 Bank walkaway, a decision by a mortgage lender to not foreclose on a defaulted mortgage
 Walkaway, a mortgage loan borrower who carries out a strategic default
 WalkAway campaign, also styled #WalkAway, a social media campaign by conservative activist Brandon Straka